KQAL (89.5 FM) is a radio station broadcasting a Variety format. Licensed to Winona, Minnesota, United States.  The station is currently owned by Winona State University and features programming from AP Radio.

History
KQAL-FM at Winona State University in Winona, Minnesota went on the air in December 1975 as a ten watt station. An alternative independent radio station from the beginning, broadcasting began from the roof of the Performing Arts Center. KQAL was started by faculty members Jacque Reidelberger and Brice Wilkinson and student manager, the late Bruce Hittner. A laboratory for the Speech Department at WSU, KQAL has been staffed primarily by students from its inception.

In 1980 KQAL, Winona's alternative music radio, was placed under the jurisdiction of the newly created Mass Communication Department at WSU. KQAL increased its power output to 1,100 watts in 1981 and it became a member of the Associated Press.

In 1989, the power output was increased to 1,800 watts and the transmitter moved from the roof of the Performing Arts Center to a 400-foot tower leased from KWNO (AM) on Garvin Heights. Also in '89 two satellite receiving dishes were installed at the Performing Arts Center.

The entire studio complex was remodeled in 1991 with new equipment and computers.

In 1995, the station's website went online and computer based digital audio editing equipment was installed.

KQAL continued the transition to the digital era in 1998 when computer based, hard drive audio storage and automation was introduced, virtually eliminating the use of tape at the station. The original system was replaced in 2002 with a new, more robust and reliable system.

In 2009 KQAL began a move from the Performing Arts Center to Phelps Hall which was extensively remodeled and new radio and TV studios were constructed. KQAL began broadcasting from these new studios in 2010.

References

External links

Radio stations in Minnesota
College radio stations in Minnesota
Winona State University